Horace William Madden, GC (14 February 1924 – 6 November 1951), also known as Bill Madden, was a soldier in the Australian Army who was a posthumous recipient of the George Cross for his conduct while a prisoner of war during the Korean War.

Early life 
Horace William Madden was born in Cronulla, a suburb of Sydney, on 14 February 1924 to Australian-born parents.  He was working as a fruiterer's assistant when he was called up for the Australian Citizens Military Forces (CMF), the militia, in May 1942.

Military career 
Madden was initially posted to the 114th Australian General Hospital in Goulburn, New South Wales. As part of the CMF, he was not required to serve outside of Australia or its territories, but despite this he transferred to the Australian Imperial Force in August 1943.  Nicknamed 'Slim' due to his lean build, Madden saw service with the 8th Field Ambulance in New Guinea, during which he contracted malaria. He later served with the 5th Motor Ambulance Convoy Platoon on Bougainville and was part of the British Commonwealth Occupation Force in Japan after the war.  He was eventually discharged from the army in June 1947.

After leaving the army, Madden took up work at a mental hospital.  Two months after the Korean War broke out, he reenlisted with the Australian Army for service as a private in Korea.  Initially assigned to 3rd Battalion, Royal Australian Regiment (3 RAR) for duty as a driver, he later volunteered for signalling duties.

In April 1951, the Chinese attacked the regiment's positions near Kapyong in what would be known as the Battle of Kapyong.  Madden was among three Australian soldiers captured during the battle.  During captivity, he demonstrated strong defiance to his captors. His defiant conduct, observed by many of the other prisoners and which would eventually see him nominated for the George Cross, was maintained despite beatings and other punishments such as extreme rationing of his food.  His ill treatment eventually resulted in his death from malnutrition sometime in late November or December 1951 at age 27.

Madden was posthumously awarded the George Cross for his conduct as a prisoner of war, which set an example for his fellow captives.

George Cross Citation 

The George Cross was presented to his sister on 9 May 1956 by the Governor of New South Wales, Lieutenant General Sir John Northcott. Madden's body was recovered following the armistice that saw an end to the war and was subsequently buried in the United Nations Memorial Cemetery at Busan, South Korea.

3 RAR's Other Rank's (OR's) canteen, located within their barracks, is officially named the "Madden Club" after Bill Madden.

Notes

References

External links
 

1924 births
1951 deaths
Military personnel from New South Wales
Australian Army personnel of World War II
Australian Army soldiers
Australian military personnel killed in the Korean War
Australian prisoners of war
Australian recipients of the George Cross
Korean War prisoners of war
People from Sydney